Charles Seton, 2nd Earl of Dunfermline PC (November 1615 – 11 May 1672), styled Lord Fyvie until the death of his father in 1622, was a Scottish peer.

Seton the son of Alexander Seton, 1st Earl of Dunfermline and Margaret, daughter of  James Hay, 7th Lord Hay of Yester and Lady Margaret Kerr. Charles was a Royalist during the Civil War, and was forced to flee the country when Charles I was executed in 1649, only to return with Charles II the next year. He held the post of Keeper of the Privy Seal of Scotland from 1661 to his death in 1672. 

Lord Dunfermline was married to Mary Douglas, daughter of William Douglas, 7th Earl of Morton and Anne Keith, daughter of George Keith, 5th Earl Marischal. She became a friend of Anne Halkett in 1650 and introduced her to King Charles at Dunfermline Palace, and travelled with her from Perth to Glamis, Brechin and Fyvie Castle.

At his death in 1672, his two sons, Alexander Seton, 3rd Earl of Dunfermline (1642–1677) and James Seton, 4th Earl of Dunfermline (died  1694) succeeded him in turn. Both died without issue, and the title became extinct when James was outlawed in 1690.

References

1615 births
1672 deaths
Earls of Dunfermline
Lords High Commissioner to the General Assembly of the Church of Scotland
Cavaliers
17th-century Scottish people
Members of the Privy Council of Scotland
Members of the Parliament of Scotland 1639–1641
Members of the Convention of the Estates of Scotland 1643–44
Charles